Cartoceto is a comune (municipality) in the Province of Pesaro e Urbino in the Italian region Marche, located about  northwest of Ancona and about  south of Pesaro.

Twin towns
 Hügelsheim, Germany

References

Cities and towns in the Marche